70 Virginis is a binary star located 58 light years from the Sun in the equatorial constellation of Virgo, near the northern constellation border with Coma Berenices. 70 Virginis is its Flamsteed designation. The star is visible to the naked eye as a faint, yellow-hued point of light with an apparent visual magnitude of +4.97.  It is drifting further away with a heliocentric radial velocity of +4.4 km/s and has a high proper motion, traversing the celestial sphere at the rate of 0.621 arc seconds per annum.

This object has a stellar classification of G4 V-IV, being rather unusually bright for a main sequence star of its type and thus may be just starting to evolve into the subgiant phase. It is an estimated 7.9 billion years old and is spinning with a projected rotational velocity of 4.8 km/s. The star has 1.12 times the mass of the Sun and 1.9 times the Sun's radius. It is radiating 2.92 times the luminosity of the Sun from its photosphere at an effective temperature of 5,406 K. The metallicity – a term astronomers use to describe the abundance of elements heavier than helium – is near solar.

In 2011, a star was discovered 2.86 arcseconds away from the primary, and is likely associated with 70 Virginis. Based on its properties, it has a spectral type later than M5V, and has a mass of about 8% that of the Sun. There is also an L-type brown dwarf 42.7 arcseconds away from the primary, but it is unclear whether this is bound to the system.

In 1996, 70 Virginis was discovered to have an extrasolar planet in orbit around it. There is also an orbiting dusty disc with an average temperature of 153 K located at a mean distance of 3.4 AU from the star.

Planetary system
The discovery of the planet around 70 Virginis was announced on January 17, 1996 at the meeting of the American Astronomical Society in San Antonio, Texas. The planet was detected using radial velocity measurements taken with the C. Donald Shane telescope at Lick Observatory. It has an orbital period of 117 days, an eccentricity of 0.4, and a mass at least 7.4 times that of Jupiter.

References

External links
 
 SolStation: 70 Virginis

G-type main-sequence stars
G-type subgiants
Planetary systems with one confirmed planet
Circumstellar disks
Virgo (constellation)
BD+14 2621
Virginis, 070
0512.1
117176
065721
5072